Leaving Rivendell is the fourth album by the Danish group The Tolkien Ensemble, with Christopher Lee as additional vocalist. It features songs composed to the lyrics found in The Lord of the Rings by J. R. R. Tolkien and forms the end part of a complete musical interpretation of all lyrics in the book.

The composer Stephen Eddins describes the music as "largely modal and melancholy". In his view the album has the correct tone for accompanying Tolkien's poems, but the music is not in the main "strong enough" to attract listeners who are not already Tolkien fans. That setting is played on guitar by Hall and sung by the Scottish musician Nick Keir, and to Eddins it "sounds authentically rooted in Celtic folk music, with occasional eccentric and unexpected but effective harmonizations". He admired the singing and playing of The Tolkien Ensemble, the Danish Radio Sinfonietta, and the Danish National Chamber Choir on the album; the conductor was  Morten Ryelund Sørensen.

Track listing

 "Riddle of Strider (II)" (Caspar Reiff)
 "Verse of the Rings (II)" (Caspar Reiff)
 "Bregalad's Song" (Caspar Reiff)
 "Legolas' Song of the Sea" (Caspar Reiff)
 "Song of the Elves Beyond the Sea - Galadriel's Song of Eldamar (II)" (Caspar Reiff)
 "Oliphaunt" (Peter Hall)
 "Ents' Marching Song" (Peter Hall)
 "Galadriel's Messages" (Caspar Reiff)
 "Song of Eärendil" (Peter Hall)
 "Song of Durin" (Peter Hall)
 "Tom Bombadil's Song (III) I Had an Errand There..." (Peter Hall)
 "Wight's Chant" (Peter Hall)
 "Ho! Tom Bombadil (II)" (Peter Hall)
 "Tom Bombadil's Song (IV)" (Caspar Reiff)
 "Théoden's Battle Cry" (Caspar Reiff)
 "At Théoden's Death" (Caspar Reiff)
 "Snowmane's Epitaph" (Caspar Reiff)
 "Burial Song of Théoden" (Caspar Reiff)
 "Long List of the Ents, No. 2" (Peter Hall)
 "Sam's Invocation of Elven Hymn to Elbereth Gilthoniel" (Peter Hall)
 "Call to Arms of the Rohirrim" (Caspar Reiff)
 "Eagle's Song" (Caspar Reiff)

Credits

 Peter Hall – founder, composer, vocals, guitar
  – founder, composer, guitar
 Signe Asmussen  – vocals
 Morten Ernst Lassen – vocals
 Katja Nielsen – double-bass
  – accordion
 Morten Ryelund Sørensen – violin
 Mads Thiemann – vocals
 Jørgen Ditlevsen – vocals
 Kurt Ravn – vocals
 Nick Keir – vocals
 The Danish National Chamber Choir/DR
 The Danish Radio Sinfonietta/DR
 Christopher Lee – recitation

References

The Tolkien Ensemble albums
2005 albums
Concept albums